Oscar Mack (September 20, 1892 – January 2, 1960) was an African-American World War I vet. An attempt was made to lynch Oscar Mack (Newspapers of the time also use the name John Mack) in Kissimmee, Osceola County, Florida. According to the United States Senate Committee on the Judiciary it was the 39th of 61 lynchings during 1922 in the United States. The New Britain Herald reported that he was lynched in Lake Jennie Jewell, in Orange County. 

Mack survived the lynching attempt and fled Florida. He married Dorothy Sanders in 1938 and had two daughters. He died in 1960.

Early life
The 1900 census of Osceola County, Florida shows a young Oscar Mack living with his parents, William and Marie Mack, as well as brothers William Jr. and Charles. William Mack Sr. was born in Georgia in 1864 and worked as a labourer. Oscar's mother was born in North Carolina in 1864, and worked as a laundress. They married in 1888. At the age of 25, he enlisted in the U.S. Army on April 26, 1918, fighting in France, and was stationed in Greece. He was honourably discharged on July 17, 1919, and returned to Osceola County, Florida, where he worked as a butcher.

Ocoee massacre

Just over a year before the lynching attempt of Mack was the Ocoee massacre. The Ocoee massacre was an incident of mass racial violence which saw a white mob attack numerous African American residents in the northern parts of Ocoee, Florida, a town located in Orange County near Orlando. The massacre killed dozens of African-Americans and took place on November 2, 1920.

Lynching attempt 
In 1922, While looking for employment he bid for a federal contract to move mail from the Kissimmee railroad depot to the post office. His winning bid undercut another contractor who verbally threatened Mack. When Mack told his boss, Assistant Postmaster C.C. Collins, about the threats Collins gave him a gun.

After Mack's first day of work three "white men — likely Klansmen — came to his house". There was an altercation and Mack used the gun given to him by Collins. In the shootout, Gene Rinehart was killed, Stuart Ivey died of his wounds a few days later, and the third assailant A.C. Aldeman escaped unharmed.
 
When word of the killing of two white men by Mack spread, a huge mob gathered. The mob hunted Oscar Mack and terrorized the local Black community, and almost 200 African-American families left the area. At one point a Black man was held by the mob but it wasn't Mack. Luckily the local sheriff was able to get the mob to release the innocent man. On July 19, 1922, newspapers like the New Britain Herald reported that Oscar Mack was lynched in Lake Jennie Jewell, in Orange County.

Assistant Postmaster C.C. Collins was forced to relocate to Tampa, Florida, due to giving Oscar a gun to defend himself.

Later life
Oscar Mack actually escaped the mob via the Florida Swamps and made his way out of the State where he changed his name to Lanier Johnson. He married Dorothy Sanders in 1938 and adopted Dorothy's child Norda May Sanders. They moved from state to state worried the KKK would find them. Moving from New Jersey to Connecticut, Youngstown, Ohio, and finally settling in Akron, Ohio around 1940, where they had two daughters, Mildred Hurt and Melissa Hurt. In January of 1944, Oscar's wife Dorothea died as a result of a cerebral hemorrhage. She was only 44 years old. There he lived until January 2, 1960.

Bibliography 
Notes

References  

1922 riots
1922 in Florida
African-American history of Florida
Lynching deaths in Florida 
February 1922 events
Protest-related deaths
Racially motivated violence against African Americans 
Riots and civil disorder in Florida 
White American riots in the United States